Annamarie Kenoyer (born July 2, 1994) is an American actress, who is known for appearing in several television shows and a few films. Her most noted role is as Ashley Whitaker in Medium.

Career
Annamarie first appeared in 2005 in Amateur, as Jeffrey Christopher Todd's little sister. She then appeared on iCarly in 2007 as Shannon, the girl that Gibby likes but has a crush on Freddie. In 2009, she appeared in Southland as Kimmy Salinger.

As of 2014, Kenoyer portrays Becca in The Fosters, a girl who is part of the group of foster girls who live on a home named Girls United. A spin-off web series of The Fosters called The Fosters: Girls United will be released on February 3, 2014, where she will be part of the main cast. The five-part series will focus on the girls who are part of the home Girls United.

In 2015, Kenoyer appeared as Ree in the feature film Lola's Last Letter, which world-premiered at the TCL Chinese Theatre in Hollywood as part of Dances with Films Festival competition lineup. The filmmakers collect and post hundreds of anonymous apology letters online and on social media, frequently posting stills from the film featuring Kenoyer's character.

Filmography

Film

Television

Video games

External links

1994 births
Living people
Place of birth missing (living people)
21st-century American actresses
American child actresses
American television actresses
American film actresses